The Kh-22 (AS-4 'Kitchen') is a large, long-range anti-ship missile developed by MKB Raduga in the Soviet Union. It was designed for use against aircraft carriers and carrier battle groups, with either a conventional or nuclear warhead. Kh-32 is the upgraded conventional/nuclear variant of Kh-22 and was accepted to service in 2016, it features an improved rocket motor and a new seeker head.

Development
After analyzing World War II naval battles and encounters in the late 1940s and early 1950s, Soviet military thinkers concluded that the era of large seaborne battles was over, and that stand-off attacks would be the way to neutralize and incapacitate large battle groups without having to field a similar force against them. Substituting cruise missiles for air attacks, Soviet Air Forces and Soviet Naval Aviation commanders set about converting their heavy bombers to raketonosets, or missile carriers, which could be launched against approaching enemy fleets from coastal or island airfields. The Kh-22 (Complex 22) weapon was developed by the Raduga design bureau and used to arm the Tupolev Tu-22M.

Design
It can be launched in either high-altitude or low-altitude mode. The missile is guided  by a gyroscope-stabilized autopilot in conjunction with a radio altimeter.

By August 2016, Russia was finalizing the trials of the Kh-32 cruise missile, a derivative of the Kh-22. The cruise missile version is also designed to target enemy ships, as well as radars, and "radio-contrast targets" like bridges, military bases, electric power plants, and others. The Kh-32 has an inertial navigation system and radar homing head, making it independent of GPS/GLONASS navigation satellites. Apparently the missile entered service in the same year. Thirty-two Kh-22 missiles will be modernized to the Kh-32 level in 2018–2020.

Operational history

The first combat-ready missiles entered service in 1962.

The missiles were used by Soviet and then Russian Air Forces on the Тu-22K ('Blinder-B') and Tu-95K22 ('Bear-G') strategic bombers. Current main launch platform is the Tupolev Tu-22M3 ('Backfire') long-range strategic bomber.

2022 Russian invasion of Ukraine 

The first combat use of the missile was reported during the 2022 Russian invasion of Ukraine. On 11 May 2022, a video emerged on internet showing a Russian Air Force Tu-22M3 strategic bomber launching a pair of two Kh-22 or Kh-32 missiles at targets somewhere in Ukraine.

The UK Ministry of Defence stated that Russia is possibly using anti-ship missiles, like the Kh-22, against ground targets. Such missiles "are highly inaccurate and therefore can cause severe collateral damage and casualties".

Between 12 May and 25 June 2022, at least 10 other Russian Kh-22 strikes in Ukraine, involving at least 44 missiles in total, were reported in the media.

On 27 June 2022, two Kh-22 or Kh-32 missiles, launched by Russian Tupolev Tu-22M3 bombers, were reportedly used in the Kremenchuk shopping mall attack, killing at least 21 people and injuring at least 59.  One missile smashed directly into the mall while the other fell about 450 meters away, into the edge of the Kredmash Road Machinery Plant, which primarily manufactures asphalt and concrete mixers, where it injured two of the 100 employees present. Both missiles might have been aimed at the same target since such distance is within the limited accuracy of Kh-22 missiles.

In the night between 30 June and 1 July 2022, three Kh-22 missiles were fired from Tu-22M3s into a 9-storey apartment building and a recreational center in Serhiivka, Ukraine, killing at least 21 people and wounding at least 39.

On 14 September 2022, it was reported at least seven Kh-22 missiles were launched by Russia at various hydraulic structures in Kryvyi Rih, including a nearby dam. Previously, the Inhulets was too shallow, allowing the Ukrainian army to build pontoon bridges during its southern counteroffensive. However, Ukrainian MoD claimed that Kh-101 missiles were used in the strike.

On 14 January 2023, a Russian missile strike, possibly using a Kh-22, demolished a 9-story apartment building in Dnipro and started a large fire. At least 44 civilians were killed and 73 were wounded in the attack.

Variants
Two initial versions were built, the Kh-22 with a large conventional warhead and the Kh-22N with a 350–1000-kiloton nuclear warhead. In the mid-1970s, this was supplemented by the Kh-22P, an anti-radiation missile for the destruction of radar installations. In the 1970s, the Kh-22 was upgraded to Kh-22M and Kh-22MA standard, with new attack profiles, somewhat longer range, and a datalink allowing mid-course updates.
 Kh-22M/MA — upgraded variants with Mach 3.3 speed and  range. Weighs , contains  of RDX.
 Kh-32 — a radically upgraded conventional/nuclear variant of Kh-22 with Mach 5 speed and  range. It features an improved rocket motor and a new seeker head. Currently produced for the Tu-22M3 launch platform.

Operators

 Russian Air Force

Former operators

 423 scrapped after Ukrainian Tu-22M fleet's decommission.

Notes

References

External links 

 Х-22 БУРЯ 
 New Kh-32 Antiship Missile Becomes Operational in Russia - part 1 Navy Recognition
 New Kh-32 Antiship Missile Becomes Operational in Russia - part 2 Navy Recognition

Cold War anti-ship missiles of the Soviet Union
Nuclear air-to-surface missiles
Kh-022
Kh-022
Kh-022
Kh-022
MKB Raduga products
Military equipment introduced in the 1960s